Mireille Batamuliza is Rwandan politician and Social Activist  who currently serve as Permanent Secretary at Ministry of Gender and Family Promotion (MIGEPROF) in Rwanda since November 2021.

Educations 
she holds Masters' Degree in Social Work at China Women's University, option of Women's Leadership and Social Development ,and Bachelor's Degree in Social Sciences  ,and she has nursing background

Career 
Prior to her appointment , she was the Director General for Family Promotion and  Child Rights Protection since August 2020. She also served as Director in Social Affairs Department at the Office of the President. she is Social activist with eught years of experience of working with Imbuto Foundation (a local non-profit Organization that contributes towards a development of a healthy, educated and prosperous society)

References 

Women government ministers of Rwanda
Family ministers of Rwanda
Living people
Year of birth missing (living people)